Muḥammad ibn Mūsā al-Kāẓim (Arabic: محمد بن موسى الکاظم) who is famous as Sabze Ghaba or Sabz-e-Qaba, is regarded as a prominent Imamzadeh who is the son of Imam Musa al-Kazim and also Imam Ali al-Rida's brother.

Muhammad ibn Musa al-Kazim who was in Medina, went out of that city due to the oppression of Abbasid dynast and likewise in order to promote his father's thoughts and his brother's Imamate. Sabze Ghaba passed burning deserts of the Arabian peninsula, and went to Khorramshahr (from Basra), afterwards he moved towards Ahvaz, and eventually he entered Dezful.

According to Seyyed Nematollah Jazayeri, Muhammad ibn Musa al-Kazim is well known as Sabze Ghaba (which means green long garment)  because of his interest in green clothes. Actually he was/is called by that name, because at majority of times he used to wear green clothes like other Alawians. Sabze Ghaba whose shrine is in the city of Dezful in Khuzestan province, finally died at the age of nineteen.

References 

Shia imams